The 1998 Illawarra Steelers season was the club's seventeenth and final season in its history, spanning across the three competitions of the NSWRL, ARL and NRL. A home loss by a field goal to the hands of the Craig Polla-Mounter and his Canterbury-Bankstown Bulldogs team, plus results going against them in the final round of the regular season saw the Steelers finish 12th.  Andrew Farrar's team of hopefuls were unable to make the finals series and were put under pressure to merge or fold when the league was expected to cut the twenty-team competition down to fourteen for the 1999 season. The club would eventually form a joint-venture with the St. George Dragons for the start of the 1999 NRL season.

Players

Squad 

(captain)

Player Movements 
Gains

Losses

Ladder

Draw and Results

Home Crowd Averages

References

External links

Illawarra Steelers seasons
Illawarra Steelers season